Madwort is a common name for several plants and may refer to:

Asperugo procumbens, native to Europe
Alyssum